Mark A. S. McMenamin (born c. 1957) is an American paleontologist and professor of geology at Mount Holyoke College. He has contributed to the study of the Cambrian explosion and the Ediacaran biota.

He is the author of several books, most recently Deep Time Analysis (2018) and Dynamic Paleontology (2016). His earlier works include The Garden of Ediacara: Discovering the Earliest Complex Life (1998), one of the only popular accounts of research on the Ediacaran biota, and Science 101: Geology (2007). He is credited with co-naming several geological formations in Mexico, describing several new fossil genera and species, and naming the Precambrian supercontinent Rodinia. The Cambrian archeocyathid species Markocyathus clementensis was named in his honor in 1989.

Early life and career
McMenamin was born in Oregon, earned his B.S. at Stanford University in 1979 and his PhD at the University of California, Santa Barbara in 1984. In 1980, while at Santa Barbara he met his future wife, Dianna, also a paleontology graduate student, with whom he would co-author several publications. He joined the staff at Mount Holyoke College in 1984. In February 2022, he and his wife discovered a Jurassic-period dinosaur fossil in Amherst, Massachusetts.

Origins of complex life 
In 1995 McMenamin led a field expedition to Sonora, Mexico, that discovered fossils (550-560 million years old) which McMenamin argued belonged to a diverse community of early animals and Ediacaran biota. The paper was published in the Proceedings of the National Academy of Sciences of the United States of America where it was reviewed by Ediacaran expert James G. Gehling. In 2011, McMenamin reported the discovery of the oldest known adult animal fossils, Proterozoic chitons from the Clemente Formation, northwestern Sonora, Mexico. Further up in this same stratigraphic sequence, McMenamin also discovered and named the early shelly fossil Sinotubulites cienegensis, a fossil that allowed the first confident Proterozoic biostratigraphic correlation between Asia and the Americas. In Lower Cambrian strata higher in the stratigraphic sequence, McMenamin also discovered important stem group brachiopods belonging to the genus Mickwitzia. During a Mount Holyoke College field trip to Death Valley, California, McMenamin and his co-authors found evidence indicating that the Proterozoic shelly fossil Qinella survived the Proterozoic-Cambrian boundary.

In 2012 McMenamin proposed that the enigmatic Cambrian trace fossil Paleodictyon was the nest of an unknown animal, a hypothesis which, if supported, may be the earliest fossil evidence of parental behavior, surpassing previous findings by 200 million years. In his 2019 article 'Cambrian Chordates and Vetulicolians', McMenamin described Shenzianyuloma yunnanense, a new genus and species of Vetulicolia interpreted as bearing myotome cones, a notochord, and gut diverticula in its posterior section.

Hypersea 
In an attempt to explain the unprecedented and rapid spread of vegetation over dry land surfaces during the middle Paleozoic, Mark and Dianna McMenamin proposed the Hypersea Theory. Their Hypersea is a geophysiological entity consisting of eukaryotic organisms on land and their symbionts. By means of a process known as hypermarine upwelling, the expansion of Hypersea led to a dramatic increase in global species diversity and a one hundred-fold increase in global biomass.

Critique of Neodarwinism
Mark McMenamin has repeatedly criticized conventional Neodarwinian theory as inadequate to the task of explaining the evolutionary process. Joining with Lynn Margulis and the Russian symbiogeneticists, McMenamin has argued that symbiogenesis theory is important as one means of addressing the gap in our understanding of macroevolutionary change in conventional Neodarwinian terms.

Phoenician coins 
In 1996, McMenamin proposed that Phoenician sailors discovered the New World c. 350 BC. The Phoenician state of Carthage minted gold staters in 350 BC bearing a pattern in the reverse exergue of the coins, which McMenamin interpreted as a map of the Mediterranean with the Americas shown to the west across the Atlantic. McMenamin later demonstrated that other (base metal) coins found in America were modern forgeries.

Triassic kraken 
Mark McMenamin and Dianna Schulte McMenamin argued that a formation of multiple ichthyosaur fossils (belonging to the genus Shonisaurus) placed together at Berlin–Ichthyosaur State Park may represent evidence of a gigantic cephalopod or Triassic kraken that killed the ichthyosaurs and intentionally arranged their bones in the unusual pattern seen at the site.

Opponents have challenged the theory as too far-fetched to be credible. PZ Myers believes that a much simpler explanation is that the rows of vertebral discs may be a result of the ichthyosaurs having fallen to one side or the other after death and rotting in that position, while Ryosuke Motani, a paleontologist at the University of California, Davis, has alternately proposed that the bones may have been moved together by ocean currents because of their circular shape. McMenamin has dismissed both of these concerns as not being in accord with either the sequence of bone placement or the hydrodynamics of the site.

Mark and Dianna McMenamin presented new evidence favoring the existence of the hypothesized Triassic kraken on October 31, 2013 at the Geological Society of America annual meeting in Denver, Colorado. Paleontologist David Fastovsky critiqued McMenamin's argument, saying that the fossil fragment used as evidence was too small to determine its origin and that the argument about currents didn't take into account the lack of knowledge about currents at the time and what would be needed to move the vertebrae. Fastovsky stated that the most likely scenario was one in which, once the tendons and ligaments holding the vertebrae together are gone, the vertebral column "sort of starts to fall over almost like a row of dominoes" with the most likely configuration for that to be the assemblage found. Adolf Seilacher has noted that this ichthyosaur bone arrangement "has never been observed at other localities".

Filmography

Books

References

External links
Mount Holyoke College Faculty Profile

1950s births
American paleontologists
Educators from Oregon
Living people
Mount Holyoke College faculty
Non-Darwinian evolution
University of California, Santa Barbara alumni
Stanford University alumni
Symbiogenesis researchers